1971 Italian Athletics Indoor Championships was the 2nd edition of the Italian Athletics Indoor Championships and were held in Genoa.

Champions

See also
1971 Italian Athletics Championships

References

External links
 FIDAL web site

Italian Athletics Championships
Athletics
Italian Athletics Indoor Championships